The Florentine Dagger  is a 1935 American film noir mystery film directed by Robert Florey.  

The film numbers among the first Hollywood movies in which psychoanalysis is a significant factor in the story.

Plot
Donald Woods plays a descendant of the Borgia line, convinced that he has inherited their murderous tendencies.  Suspicions deepen when the father of the girl he loves turns up stabbed to death with a Florentine dagger.

Cast

 Donald Woods as Juan Cesare
 Margaret Lindsay as Florence Ballau
 C. Aubrey Smith as Dr. Lytton
 Henry O'Neill as Victor Ballau
 Robert Barrat as Inspector Von Brinkner
 Florence Fair as Teresa Holspar
 Frank Reicher as Stage Manager
 Charles Judels as Hotel Proprietor
 Rafaela Ottiano as Lili Salvatore
 Paul Porcasi as Italian policeman
 Eily Malyon as Fredericka, mask maker
 Egon Brecher as Lytton's butler
 Herman Bing as The baker
 Henry Kolker as The auctioneer

Box Office
According to Warner Bros records the film earned $185,000 domestically and $75,000 foreign.

References

External links
 
 
 

1935 films
Films directed by Robert Florey
Warner Bros. films
1935 mystery films
American mystery films
Films set in Vienna
American black-and-white films
1930s American films
Films scored by Bernhard Kaun
Film noir
House of Borgia